Buck Fever was the second full-length album released by Estradasphere. Notable assistance on the album comes from Trey Spruance, of Mr. Bungle and Secret Chiefs 3 fame.

Track listing
"Buck Fever" – 5:45
"The Dapper Bandits" – 8:03
"The Silent Elk of Yesterday" – 6:17
"Crag Lake" – 0:48
"Meteorite Showers" – 8:14
"The Bounty Hunter" – 6:17
"Super Buck II" (Cover of Super Mario Bros. 2 ground theme)– 2:35
"Millennium Child" – 8:16
"Trampoline Klan" – 2:02
"Burnt Corpse" – 0:14
"Rise n' Shine (Epic Doobie Nightmare #"1)" – 2:27
"Bride of the Buck" – 1:39
"A Very Intense Battle" – 8:40
"Green Hill" – 1:25
"Feed Your Mama's Meter (Remix 2001)" – 4:15
"What Deers May Come" – 5:28

Album credits

The Band ("The Big Game Hunters")
Timb Harris – solo violin, violin sections, solo and section trumpets, mandolin, euphonium, keyboards.
David Murray – drums, didjeridu, percussion, (djembe, shaker, tambourine, timpani, roto toms, dombek, orchestral percussion), new age keyboards.
Jason Schimmel – acoustic and electric guitars, baritone guitar, sitar guitar, banjo, lapsteel, keyboard (organs, piano, glockenspiel, toy piano, choir, chimes, electric pino, clav)
Tim Smolens – upright bass, hollowbody and electric bass, bowed bass sections, keyboard (synth bass, handclaps, organs, timpani, gong, strings, sound fx, samples, choir, new age sounds, etc.) synth programming, techno loops.
John Whooley – tenor, alto, baritone and soprano saxophones, flute, vocals, throat singing, percussion (congas, clave, guiro, shaker, tambourine, woodblock, cowbell), accordion, piano, cp-70, electric piano, clav

Personnel ("Seasonal Hunters")
Producer: Tim Smolens
Recording Engineer: Tim Smolens
Recording Engineer (drums): Justin Phelps, Trey Spruance
Mastered: Thom Canova with Tim & Timb at Found Sound, San Francisco, California
Art direction: Butt Bud & Mari Kono
Graphic Artist: Mari Kono
Head Goon: Tim
Photographs: Mari Kono
Goon Squad: Timb, Jay

Dedication
Buck Fever was created in memory of Smith Dobson.

References

2002 albums
Estradasphere albums
Web of Mimicry albums